Three Sailors (French: Trois de la marine) is a 1934 French comedy film directed by Charles Barrois and starring Armand Bernard, Betty Stockfeld and Henri Alibert. It was remade in 1957.

Cast

References

Bibliography 
 Goble, Alan. The Complete Index to Literary Sources in Film. Walter de Gruyter, 1999.

External links 
 

1934 films
1934 comedy films
French comedy films
1930s French-language films
Seafaring films
French black-and-white films
Films based on operettas
1930s French films